The American Pet Products Association  (APPA) is a not-for-profit industry association founded in 1958 and headquartered in Stamford, Connecticut. The APPA represents more than 1,000 pet product manufacturers, importers of pet products, and suppliers of products for non-pet livestock as well.

APPMA supports the interests of its members through public policy, public affairs, and animal awareness. In 2008, it dropped the word Manufacturers from its name.

The APPA organizes the Global Pet Expo annually. The 2012 expo featured 896 exhibitors. The organization also releases a biennial National Pet Owners Survey which compiles data on pet ownership and purchasing trends.

References

External links

National Pet Owners Survey

Trade associations based in the United States
Non-profit organizations based in Connecticut
Organizations established in 1958
1958 establishments in Connecticut
Companies based in Stamford, Connecticut
Organizations based in Stamford, Connecticut